Bob Mordell (born 2 July 1953) is an English former professional rugby union and rugby league footballer, and also a manager. He played rugby league as a professional for Oldham (Heritage № 837), Kent Invicta and Fulham RLFC (Heritage № 80). He was the manager at Kent Invicta. He represented England in rugby union on one occasion. At club level his played his rugby union for Wasps FC, including their tour to Kenya in 1973, and  Rosslyn Park, and represented Middlesex at county level. He played as a flanker.

Rugby union
He played his early rugby for the Thamesians club.

Mordell played rugby union for Rosslyn Park during the 1970s, and was in the Middlesex team that won the County Championship in 1976.

He played international rugby union for England, with his sole appearance coming against Wales in the opening match of the 1978 Five Nations. Mordell went on the 1979 tour of Japan with England but did not feature in the test matches.

Rugby league
Mordell signed professional terms with Oldham in 1979. Whilst at Oldham he had his jaw broken by fellow rugby union convert Paul Woods.

Mordell signed for Kent Invicta before their début season in 1983 for £13,500. The well-respected attacking forward was named as captain of the fledgling Kent outfit.

References

External links
Brendan Gallagher: The one cap wonders woefully short-changed

1953 births
Living people
British rugby league administrators
England international rugby union players
English rugby league coaches
English rugby league players
English rugby union players
Kent Invicta captains
Kent Invicta coaches
Kent Invicta players
London Broncos players
Oldham R.L.F.C. players
Rosslyn Park F.C. players
Rugby league players from Greater London
Rugby league second-rows
Rugby union flankers